In molecular biology, the fungal fruit body lectin family consists of several fungal fruit body lectin proteins. Fruit body lectins are thought to have insecticidal activity  and may also function in capturing nematodes. One member of this family, the lectin XCL from Boletus chrysenteron (formerly Xerocomus chrysenteron), induces drastic changes in the actin cytoskeleton after sugar binding at the cell surface and internalisation, and has potent insecticidal activity. The fold of lectin XCL is not related to any of several other lectin folds, but shows significant structural similarity to cytolysins.

References

Protein families